Chencho may refer to:

 Chencho Corleone, member of the Puerto Rican reggaeton duo Plan B
 Chencho Gyeltshen (born 1996), Bhutanese footballer
 Chencho Nio, Bhutanese footballer
 El Chencho, Anthony Atencio